Ryan Semple (born October 21, 1982 in Montreal, Quebec) is a Canadian alpine skier from Ottawa, Ontario.

Semple's best finish on the Alpine skiing World Cup circuit is 11th place in a combined at Kitzbühel in 2010. Semple has also competed at multiple FIS Alpine World Ski Championships, finishing 15th in the 2005 giant slalom and 19th in the 2007 combined.

Semple competed in both the giant slalom and the combined at the 2006 Olympics in Turin. He failed to finish his first run in the giant slalom, and while he did finish the downhill portion of the combined, he did not finish the first run of the slalom. At the 2010 Olympics in Vancouver he finished 15th in the super combined.
He is a graduate of Ashbury College, a private boarding school in Ottawa, Ontario.

References

External links
FIS biography
Official site

1982 births
Living people
Olympic alpine skiers of Canada
Alpine skiers at the 2006 Winter Olympics
Alpine skiers at the 2010 Winter Olympics
Canadian male alpine skiers
Anglophone Quebec people
Skiers from Montreal
Skiers from Ottawa